Baccilieri is a surname. Notable people with the surname include:

Bobby Bacala Baccilieri, character from The Sopranos
Ferdinando Maria Baccilieri (1821–1893), Italian Roman Catholic priest
Uber Baccilieri (1923–2007), Italian boxer

Italian-language surnames